The 1991 Segunda División de Chile was the 40th season of the Segunda División de Chile.

Deportes Temuco was the tournament's champion.

Aggregate table

North Zone

South Zone

Second phase

Promotion playoffs

Relegation playoffs

See also
Chilean football league system

References

External links
 RSSSF - List of Second Division Champions

Segunda División de Chile (1952–1995) seasons
Primera B
1991 in South American football leagues